SSSA may refer to:

 Soil Science Society of America
 Sant'Anna School of Advanced Studies
 Soaring Society of South Africa
 South Sweden School of Aeronautics